Reverend's Colt (originally titled Reverendo Colt) is a 1970 Spanish-Italian Spaghetti Western directed by León Klimovsky.

Cast 

 Guy Madison: Reverend Miller 
 Richard Harrison: Sheriff Donovan 
 Ennio Girolami: Mestizo (credited as Thomas Moore) 
 María Martín: Mary MacMurray 
 Germán Cobos: Fred 
 Ignazio Spalla: Meticcio (credited as Pedro Sanchez) 
 Steven Tedd: Gary 
 Perla Cristal: Dorothy 
 Alfonso Rojas: Colonel Charles Jackson  
 Cris Huerta: Pat MacMurray (credited as Cris Huertas) 
 José Canalejas: Martin

References

External links

Spaghetti Western films
Spanish Western (genre) films
1970 Western (genre) films
1970 films
1970s Italian-language films
English-language Italian films
English-language Spanish films
1970s English-language films
1970s Spanish-language films
Films directed by León Klimovsky
Films scored by Piero Umiliani
Films scored by Gianni Ferrio
1970 multilingual films
Italian multilingual films
Spanish multilingual films
1970s Italian films